Di Første Jul is Norwegian singer Tone Damli's fifth studio album. The album was released on 17 November 2014. The album peaked at number 9 on the Norwegian Albums Chart, becoming her third top ten album.

Background
Di Første Jul is Damli's first Christmas album, and first singing in her native Norwegian. All songs are ballads here, aside from the festive barn dance anthem "Vinder og Snø’".

Track listing
 "Når Himmelen Dette Ned" - 3:55
 "Luciasang" - 3:50
 "Di Første Jul" - 3:44
 "Jul, Jul, Strålande Jul" - 3:44
 "Jon Blund" - 2:04
 "Snø" - 3:58
 "Mitt Hjerte Alltid Vanker" - 3:32
 "Vinter Og Snø" - 2:52
 "Vi Tenner Våre Lykter" - 3:30
 "Fager Er Jordi" - 2:39

Charts

Release history

References

2014 Christmas albums
Tone Damli albums
Pop Christmas albums